Russia participated in the Eurovision Song Contest 2006 in Athens, Greece. The Russian entry was selected internally by the Russian broadcaster Channel One Russia (C1R). Dima Bilan represented Russia with the song "Never Let You Go", which qualified from the semi-final and placed 2nd in the final, scoring 248 points. This 2nd place, alongside the 2nd place of Alsou in 2000, was the best result of Russia until 2008.

Before Eurovision

Internal selection 
On 26 January 2006, C1R announced a submission period for interested artists and composers to submit their entries until 1 March 2006. A jury panel evaluated the received submissions on 7 March 2006 and selected the Russian entry. The jury consisted of Konstantin Ernst (general manager of C1R), Yuriy Aksyuta (music director of C1R), Ilya Bachurin (vice president of MTV Russia), Alexander Polesitskiy (general director of Europa Plus), Vladimir Matetsky (singer-songwriter and producer), Viktor Drobysh (composer and producer) and Larisa Dolina (singer).

On 7 March 2006, C1R announced that they had internally selected Dima Bilan to represent Russia in Athens. Bilan's selection as the Russian representative was decided upon by the jury panel from three shortlisted candidates: Ariana, Bilan and Varvara. Bilan previously attempted to represent Russia at the Eurovision Song Contest in 2004 and 2005. A new contest song was to be composed on the request of the jury, with "Never Let You Go" being kept as a backup, however "Never Let You Go" was ultimately selected as the Russian song due to a lack of time to create a new song within ten days for the official entry to be submitted to the European Broadcasting Union. "Never Let You Go" was composed by Alexander Lunyov, with lyrics by Irina Antonyan and Karen Kavaleryan; Antonyan and Kavaleryan previously co-wrote the lyrics for the 2002 Russian entry.

At Eurovision
Since Russia did not place in the top 10 countries (excluding the Big Four) in the 2005 Contest, Russia was required to compete in the semi-final of the Eurovision Song Contest 2006 on 18 May 2006. On 21 March 2006, Russia was drawn to perform 13th in the semi-final, following Poland and preceding Turkey.

For the Russian performance, Bilan was joined on stage by two ballerinas and two backing vocalists as well as a hollow white piano where a third ballerina emerged from a rose covered opening later in the performance. Russia qualified from the semi-final, placing 3rd and scoring 217 points. Since Russia was the first national announced as a qualifying country during the semi-final broadcast, Russia took the first available qualifier spot in the final running order. In the final, Russia performed 10th, following Denmark and preceding Macedonia. After the voting concluded, Russia scored 248 points and placed 2nd. Since Russia was among the top 10 countries, excluding the nations that constitute the Big Four, Russia pre-qualified to compete directly in the final of the 2007 Contest.

The semi-final and final were broadcast on Channel One, with commentary by Yuriy Aksyuta and Tatyana Godunova. The voting spokesperson for Russia was Yana Churikova.

Voting

Points awarded to Russia

Points awarded by Russia

References

2006
Countries in the Eurovision Song Contest 2006
Eurovision